Yusuf is a male name meaning "God increases" (in piety, power and influence). It is the Arabic equivalent of the Hebrew name Yosef and the English name Joseph. It is widely used in many parts of the world by Arabs of all Abrahamic religions, including Middle Eastern Jews, Arab Christians, and Muslims. 

It is also transliterated in many ways, including Yousef, Yousif, Youssef, Youssif, Yousuf and Yusef.

Given name

Yossef
Yossef Karami (born 1983), Iranian Taekwondo athlete
Yossef Romano (1940–1972), Libyan-born Israeli weightlifter (also known as Joseph Romano or Yossi Romano), killed in the 1972 Munich massacre

Youcef
Youcef Abdi (born 1977), Australian athlete
Youcef Belaïli, Algerian footballer
Youcef Ghazali, Algerian footballer
Youcef Nadarkhani, Iranian sentenced to death for Christian beliefs
Youcef Touati, Algerian footballer

Yousef
Yousef El Nasri (born 1979), Spanish long distance runner
Yousef Beidas (1912–1968), Palestinian Lebanese banker
Yousef Erakat, Palestinian-American YouTube personality
Yousef Saanei (born 1937), Iranian cleric and politician
Yousef Sheikh Al-Eshra, Syrian footballer

Yousif
Yousif Ghafari, American businessman
Yousif Hassan, Emirati footballer

Youssef
Youssef Abdelke, Syrian artist
Youssef Aftimus (1866–1952), Lebanese civil engineer and architect
Youssef Bey Karam (1823–1889), Lebanese nationalist leader
Youssef Chahine (1926–2008), Egyptian film director
Youssef Hossam (born 1998), Egyptian tennis player
Youssef Hussein (born 1988), Egyptian comedian
Youssef Ibrahim (born 1999), Egyptian squash player
Youssef Ibrahim (born 1994), nicknamed Youssef Obama, Egyptian footballer

Youssif
Youssif (burn victim), Iraqi torture victim

Youssof
Youssof Kohzad, Afghan American writer and artist

Youssouf
Youssouf Bakayoko, Minister for Foreign Affairs of Ivory Coast
Youssouf Hadji (born 1980), Moroccan footballer
Youssouf Hersi (born 1982), Dutch soccer player
Youssouf Mulumbu (born 1987), Congolese footballer

Yusef
Yusef of Morocco (Yusef ben Hassan, 1882–1927), ruler of Morocco (1912–27)
Yusef Ahmed (born 1988), Qatari international footballer
Yusef al-Ayeri (1973–2003), Saudi Arabian terrorist, first leader Al-Qaeda in the Arabian Peninsula
Yusef Ali Khan (1816–1865), Nawab (1855–1865) in the princely state of Rampur (now in Uttar Pradesyh, India)
Yusef Greiss (1899–1961), Egyptian composer
Yusef Hawkins (also Yusuf Hawkins, 1973–1989), American murder victim in Brooklyn, New York City attacked by a racist mob
Yusef Khan, fictional character in the British television soap opera EastEnders
Yusef Khan-e Gorji (died 1824), Iranian military leader 
Yusef Komunyakaa (born 1941), American poet
Yusef Lateef (1920–2013), American jazz musician
Yusef Majidzadeh (born 1938), Iranian archaeologist
Yusef Mishleb (also known as Yosef Mishlev, born 1952), Druze General in the Israel Defense Forces
Yusef Sozi (born 1981), Ugandan-British rugby league footballer
Yusef Urabi (died 1966), Palestinian officer in the Syrian Army in a Palestinian Liberation Army unit and member of Fatah

Yusof
Yusof Ishak (1910–1970), first President of Singapore

Yussef
Yussef al-Shihri (1985–2009), Saudi Arabian extrajudicial detainee at Guantanamo Bay

Yussuf

Yussuf Poulsen (born 1994), Danish footballer

Yusuf
Yusuf ibn Muhammad, known as Al-Mustanjid, the caliph of Baghdad 1160–1170
 Yusuf Emre Fırat (born 2000), Turkish cross-country skier
Yusuf I, Sultan of Granada (1318–54), seventh Nasrid ruler of the Emirate of Granada in Al-Andalus on the Iberian Peninsula
Yusuf II, Almohad ruler (c. 1203–1224), the ruler of Morocco
Yusuf Abdulla, South African cricketer
Abu al-Mahasin Yusuf al-Mustanjid, the caliph for the Mamluk Sultanate (1455–1479)
Yusuf al-Azma (1883–1920), Syrian War Minister, military officer in the Ottoman Empire
Yusuf Ali (disambiguation), several people
Yūsuf Balasaguni, Uyghur scribe
Yusuf Başer (born 1980), Turkish karateka
Yusuf Bey (1935–2003), American Muslim and Black Nationalist leader and activist 
Yusuf bin Ahmad al-Kawneyn, Somali Muslim scholar
Yusuf bin Alawi bin Abdullah (born 1945), Omani politician
Yusuf Corker (born 1998), American football player
Yusuf Dadoo, South African communist activist
Yusuf Dikeç (born 1983), Turkish sport shooter
Yusuf Ekinci, Turkish lawyer
Yusuf Garaad Omar, Somali journalist
Yusuf Halaçoğlu (born 1949), Turkish historian and politician
Yusuf Hamied, Indian billionaire
Yusuf Hamadani (1062–1141), Persian Sufi teacher active in Central Asia
Yusuf Islam, British musician, formerly known as Cat Stevens
Yusuf ibn Tashfin (c.1061–1106), King of the Berber Almoravid empire
Yusuf İsmail (1857–1898), Turkish wrestler
Yusuf Karamanli (1766–1838), pasha of the Karamanli dynasty in Tripolitania (modern day province of Libya)
Yusuf Khatri, Indian master craftsman
Yusuf Kurtuluş, Turkish footballer
Yusuf Ma Dexin, Chinese Muslim scholar
Yusuf Mersin, Turkish footballer
Yusuf Nabi, Turkish writer
Yusuf Öztürk (footballer), Turkish footballer
Yusuf Öztürk (boxer), Turkish boxer
Yusuf al-Qaradawi (1926–2022), Egyptian Islamic theologian, (former) leading member of the Muslim Brotherhood
Yusuf Salim (1929–2008), American jazz pianist and composer
Yusuf Salman Yusuf, Iraqi communist activist
Yusuf Siddiq (born 1957), Bangladeshi epigraphist
Yusuf Şimşek, Turkish footballer
Yusuf Taktak (born 1951), Turkish artists
Yusuf Uçar (born 1987), Turkish paralympic goalball player
Yusuf Yasin (1888−1962), Syrian-origin Saudi Arabian politician
Yusuf Yazıcı, Turkish footballer
Yusuf Yilmaz, Turkish footballer
Abu Yusuf Al-Turki (also known as, Ümit Yaşar Toprak, c. 1967–2014), Turkish sniper active in the al-Nusra Front

Jusuf
Jusuf Nurkić, Bosnian basketball player

Surname

Giousouf
Cemile Giousouf (born 1978), German politician of Turkish ethnicity

Yousaf
Humza Yousaf (born 1985), Scottish politician

Yousef
Abd-El-Aziz Yousef (born 1999), Somali footballer
Farrah Yousef (born 1989), Syrian singer
Hediya Yousef, Syrian-Kurdish politician
Mosab Hassan Yousef, Palestinian spy working for Israel
Ramzi Yousef (born 1968), Pakistani terrorist who organized 1993 World Trade Center bombing
Rasmea Yousef, Jordanian associate director of the Arab American Action Network

Youssef
Bassem Youssef (born 1974), Egyptian writer and comedian
Dhafer Youssef (born 1967), Tunisian singer and oud player
Maimouna Youssef (stage name: Mumu Fresh), American singer and rapper
 Maya Youssef, Syrian musician
Mohamed Youssef (born 1986), Libyan basketball player
Muhammad Youssef al-Najjar (also known as Abu Youssef, 1930–1973), Palestinian militant
Ramy Youssef (born 1980), Egyptian handball player
Ramy Youssef (born 1991), American actor of Egyptian origin
Michael Youssef (born 1948), Arab-American clergyman

Yousuf
Mohammad Yousuf (cricketer) (born 1974), Pakistani cricketer

Yusef
Anatol Yusef (born 1978), British actor
Malik Yusef (born 1971), American performing poet and rapper
Mohammad Yusef the Painter, Persian Safavid dynasty artist
Molla Yusef (disambiguation), several people

Yusof
Khairuddin Mohamed Yusof (born 1939), Malaysian Professor Emeritus at the University of Malaya
Meor Aziddin Yusof (born 1967), Malaysian folk singer-songwriter
Mohammad Said  Yusof, member of the Malaysian Parliament

Yusuf
Abdullah Yusuf Ali, South Asian Islamic scholar
Abdullahi Yusuf Ahmed, former President of Somalia
Abu Yaqub Yusuf (1135–1184), second Almohad caliph, reigned in Marrakesh
Ali Yusuf Kenadid, Somali Sultan of the Sultanate of Hobyo
Haji Bashir Ismail Yusuf, Somali politician
Hamza Yusuf (born 1958), American Islamic scholar
Hanna Yusuf (1992–2019), Somali-British journalist and broadcaster
Isa Yusuf Alptekin, Uyghur politician
Mohammad Yusuf (politician) (1917–1998), prime minister of Afghanistan
Mohammed Yusuf (Boko Haram) (also known as Ustaz Mohammed Yusuf, 1970–2009), Nigerian Muslim sect founder and leader
Osman Yusuf Kenadid, Somali scholar
Sami Yusuf (born 1980), British singer-songwriter

Yussuf

Yusuff

Yussuff

See also
Joseph (given name)
Joseph in Islam
Yusuf Muhammad (disambiguation)
Hajj Yusef (disambiguation) – places
Hajji Yusef (disambiguation) – places 
Arabic name
Turkish name

References

Arabic-language surnames
Arabic masculine given names
Pakistani masculine given names
Turkish masculine given names
Coptic given names